On 2 July 2013, Polar Airlines Flight 9949, a Mil Mi-8 helicopter operated by Polar Airlines crashed near Deputatsky, an urban locality of Ust-Yansky District in the Sakha Republic, Russia, with 25 passengers (including 11 children) and three crew members on board. According to a Ministry of Emergency Situations spokesman, 24 people died in the crash; the three crew members and a child survived. Early reports suggested that the pilot lost control of the helicopter due to strong winds. The crash was investigated by the Interstate Aviation Committee.

Accident
At 10:00 PM local time, the flight crew underwent a pre-flight medical exam at the local hospital in the village of Deputatsky, with no health concerns noted the crew were cleared to operate the flight, which was scheduled for 11:00 PM local time. The flight mechanic refueled the helicopter with 2800 liters of ice resistant fuel. At 10:30 PM, the pilots received the meteorological forecast for the route, seeing no concerns he signed it off.

At 11:38 PM, the Pilot in Command requested to take-off using Visual flight rules, and to start their engines, they received confirmation for both. At 11:51 PM, flight 9949 received take-off clearance 51 minutes past the scheduled departure time, soon after the flight lifted off making a right hand turn. At 11:58:46 PM, the flight crew reported their status to the dispatch office, this was the last radio communication from flight 9949.

At 12:13 AM, the helicopter crashed into an elevated outcropping, completely destroying the aircraft. At 12:34, the PIC using a satellite phone called to report the crash, and that there were some survivors but many more fatalities. In total all 3 crew members and 1 passenger survived the crash.

References

External links
 "02.07.2013 Ми-8Т RA-22657." Interstate Aviation Committee. Current IAC page, in Russian
Final Report

Aviation accidents and incidents in 2013
Aviation accidents and incidents in Russia
Accidents and incidents involving the Mil Mi-8
2013 disasters in Russia
Transport in the Sakha Republic
July 2013 events in Russia